William Griffin (c.1811 – 13 July 1870) was a New Zealand painter, glazier, labour reformer and gold miner. He was born c. 1811.

References

1811 births
1870 deaths
New Zealand miners
New Zealand activists
Glaziers
19th-century New Zealand painters
19th-century New Zealand male artists